Chaumont is a village in Jefferson County, New York,  United States. Its population was 624 at the 2010 census. The village is named for Jacques-Donatien Le Ray de Chaumont, son of Benjamin Franklin's landlord and friend at Passy in France. The village of Chaumont is in the town of Lyme and is northwest of Watertown.

History 
In 1750, Ray had bought the Chaumont castle (named from the Old French for "bald hill", and built in two periods around 1500) in the Loire Valley of France. (the village near it is called Chaumont-sur-Loire to distinguish it from the many other Chaumonts in France.) His son, known as James Leray or James Leray Chaumont, travelled to the United States and later settled there.

The first European-descended settlement of the village began in 1802, replacing an unsatisfactory site chosen the previous year. The economy of the early village was based on fishing and ship building.

In July 1853, the community contained about fifty dwellings, along with other structures. Chaumont was incorporated as a village in 1874, and its historic core was listed on the National Register of Historic Places in 1990 as the Chaumont Historic District. The village has twice been proposed to be dissolved into the surrounding town of Lyme. The first dissolution referendum was defeated by a margin of 129–72 in March 1999; a second attempt was rejected by a 145–102 margin on November 6, 2012.

In addition to the Chaumont Historic District, the Cedar Grove Cemetery, Chaumont Grange Hall and Dairymen's League Building, Chaumont House, Chaumont Railroad Station, George Brothers Building, George House, and Menzo Wheeler House are listed on the National Register of Historic Places.

Geography
Chaumont is in the west-central part of Jefferson County, in the northeastern portion of the town of Lyme.

The village is on the south side of the Chaumont River, where it empties into Chaumont Bay, an arm of Lake Ontario. Much of the village is on a peninsula, which ends at Independence Point.

New York State Route 12E passes through the village as Main Street. The highway leads southeast  to Watertown, the county seat, and northwest  to Cape Vincent on the St. Lawrence River. County Route 179 (Evans Street) enters the village from the northeast and leads  to Depauville.

Climate
Snowfall is well above the United States average in the months of October through April, reaching  in January.

Demographics

As of the census of July 2009, there were 638 people, up 7.8% since 2000. 46.8%(298) of residents were male and 53.2%(340) were female. The median resident age at this time was 38.8 years. The 2000 census recorded 592 people, 233 households, and 143 families residing in the village. The population density was 578.2 people per square mile (224.1/km2). There were 273 housing units at an average density of 266.6 per square mile (103.3/km2). The racial makeup of the village was 96.79% White, 1.69% African American, 0.68% Native American, and 0.84% from two or more races. Hispanic or Latino of any race were 1.01% of the population.

There were 233 households, out of which 30.5% had children under the age of 18 living with them, 47.6% were married couples living together, 11.2% had a female householder with no husband present, and 38.2% were non-families. 33.0% of all households were made up of individuals, and 19.7% had someone living alone who was 65 years of age or older. The average household size was 2.48 and the average family size was 3.22.

In the village, the population was spread out, with 25.0% under the age of 18, 9.8% from 18 to 24, 27.0% from 25 to 44, 22.6% from 45 to 64, and 15.5% who were 65 years of age or older. The median age was 39 years. For every 100 females, there were 87.9 males. For every 100 females age 18 and over, there were 80.5 males.

The estimated median household income was $50,471 in 2008. In 2000 the income was estimated to be $37,750 and the median income for a family was $49,107. Males had a median income of $34,375 versus $26,000 for females. The per capita income for the village was $16,608. About 1.6% of families and 8.4% of the population were below the poverty line, including 4.2% of those under age 18 and 9.5% of those age 65 or over.

Attractions
Local businesses include restaurants such as Wise Guys Pizza, The Blue Heron, Crescent Restaurant and Bar, Valley Peetza, the Duck Stop Diner and Duck Out Ice Cream, seasonally. Shopping is offered at the Chaumont Country Store, Nice & Easy, Chaumont Wine & Spirits and others. Also located in Chaumont the Crescent Yacht Club, Chaumont Bay Marina and Guffin Bay Marina.

References

External links
 Chaumontny.org, Lyme Parks and Recreation
 Lyme Community Foundation
 Chaumont–Three Mile Bay Chamber of Commerce

Villages in New York (state)
Villages in Jefferson County, New York
Populated places on Lake Ontario in the United States